Calvin Thomas Craddock Dufty (10 March 1900 – 1 August 1955) was a New Zealand rugby league player who represented New Zealand.

Early life
Dufty had sisters; Louisa Esther (1901-26), Annie Elizabeth (1902-62), Jessie May (1909-37), and Gwendoline Pearl (1919-90), a brother Cecil Charles who died in infancy (1905), and brothers Thomas Joseph (1899-1949), Samuel Craddock (1911-79), and Arthur (Artie) James (1911-89).

War service
During World War I, Dufty served with the New Zealand Expeditionary Force, embarking in 1916 when aged 16.

Playing career
Dufty played in the Auckland Rugby League competition for Newton Rangers (1919-21, & 1927-29), Athletic/Grafton Athletic (1922-26), and Ellerslie United (1929-30). He transferred to Ellerslie after moving to the area during 1929 after playing several games for Newton during the season.

In 1919, aged 19, Dufty made his debut for Auckland, starring in the regions 37-13 defence of the Northern Union Cup against Hawke's Bay. His performance earned him selection for the New Zealand squad that played against the first tour of Australia.

In 1922 he toured Australia with the New Zealand Māori side. He played in five inter-island games for the North Island, his last being in 1930.

In 1922 and 1924 he played for both Auckland and Auckland Province. In 1922 his appearances were against the touring New South Wales team, while in 1924 his appearances were against the touring Great Britain Lions. He was part of the disastrous 1926-27 New Zealand tour of Great Britain, which resulted in several forwards going on strike and receiving life bans. In 1928 he again played the touring Lions, representing both Auckland City and Auckland Province, as well as New Zealand.

Dufty finished his career with a then-record 224 points for New Zealand, including 106 goals. He played in twelve test matches, scoring 41 points.

Death
Dufty was born to Samuel and Emily (nee Bennett). On August 1, 1955 Craddock Dufty died while at Auckland Public Hospital. His wife was Ethel May (nee Gerraty) who had had married in 1921. She had passed away in 1953 on June 9. Craddock Dufty was buried at Waikumete Cemetery. He was survived by two daughters and a son (June, Moira Coral (1928-86), and Craddock).

References

1900 births
1955 deaths
New Zealand rugby league players
New Zealand Māori rugby league players
New Zealand Māori rugby league team players
New Zealand national rugby league team players
Auckland rugby league team players
Rugby league fullbacks
Maritime Football Club players
Ellerslie Eagles players
City Rovers players
Rugby league centres
Rugby league wingers
North Island rugby league team players
New Zealand military personnel of World War I
Newton Rangers players